Old Wilkes County Jail is a historic jail located at the Wilkes Heritage Museum in Wilkesboro, Wilkes County, North Carolina. It was built in 1858, and is a two-story, rectangular brick building with a low hipped roof.  The jail retains much of its original hardware including strap hinges and several early locks.

It was listed on the National Register of Historic Places in 1971.

References

External links
Wilkes Heritage Museum website

Jails on the National Register of Historic Places in North Carolina
Government buildings completed in 1858
Museums in Wilkes County, North Carolina
National Register of Historic Places in Wilkes County, North Carolina
1858 establishments in North Carolina